The Championnat Fédéral Nationale, also known simply as the Nationale, is the third tier of rugby union club competition division in France. Introduced in 2020, it is operated by the French Rugby Federation (FFR).

Season structure 
There is relegation and promotion between both the Rugby Pro D2 and Nationale 2, the fourth-level competition. Nationale conducts a play-off system similar to the one currently used in Pro D2, with the top six teams qualifying for the play-offs and the top two teams receiving byes into the semi-finals. The winner of each semi-final earns automatic promotion to the next season's Pro D2 if they are eligible financially to do so. The bottom two are automatically relegated to Nationale 2. The bottom two clubs of the Pro D2 and the top two of Nationale 2 then enter Nationale for the next season.

There are 26 rounds in the regular season, with each team playing each other team home and away. The two halves of the season are played in the same order, with the away team in the first half of the season at home in the second half. The semi-finals and final take place in May, with the semi-finals being held over two-legs and the final taking place at a predetermined site. At present, 14 clubs compete in the competition.

Current teams

2021–22 season

See also
 French Rugby Federation
 Rugby union in France

References

External links
 Nationale at the French Rugby Federation 

 
3
Professional sports leagues in France
France